Jean-Pierre Duport (27 November 1741 – 31 December 1818) was a cellist of the late 18th and early 19th centuries. Along with his brother, Jean-Louis Duport (also a cellist), he was active in the musical life of France and Germany. Jean-Pierre was the son of a dancing master, and a student of the founder of the French school of cello playing Martin Berteau (1691–1771).

Career
After studying with Berteau, Jean-Pierre Duport made his debut at the age of 19 at the Concert Spirituel, then the center for non-operatic music in Paris. Between 1766 and 1769 Duport was employed by the Prince of Conti, after which he spent two years in England and two years in Spain. In 1773, Frederick the Great the King of Prussia offered Duport a position as principal cellist of his orchestra, and Duport accepted and remained in Berlin for the rest of his life. Duport was the cello tutor of Frederick's nephew, Prince Friedrich Wilhelm II, and soon after Friedrich Wilhelm II was crowned king in 1786, Duport was placed in charge of all chamber music at the court. In 1790, Duport's younger brother Jean-Louis Duport joined him in Berlin, fleeing the French Revolution. Between the two of them, and the patronage of Friedrich Wilhelm II, Berlin became a "magnet for new compositions for the cello"   until Napoleon defeated Prussia and captured Berlin in 1806. At this point the younger brother returned to Paris, while the elder Duport remained in Berlin until his death in 1818.

Duport and his younger brother were acquainted with Beethoven: in February 1796 Beethoven had left Vienna for a five-month concert tour which took him to Prague (accompanied by Prince Lichnowsky, who had travelled there with Mozart in 1789), Dresden, Leipzig, and Berlin, where he was inspired by the high level and quality of musical activity at the court of King Friedrich Wilhelm II of Prussia, at which Jean-Pierre was director of chamber music. On the Potsdam court, Beethoven's two opus 5 cello sonatas were composed for him. Either Duport or his younger brother played the cello part with Beethoven at the keyboard at the premier performance of these sonatas.

References

External links
 Jean-Pierre and Jean-Louis Duport at cello.org
 

French classical cellists
1741 births
1818 deaths